South Whittier is an unincorporated community and census-designated place in Los Angeles County, California just south of the city of Whittier.  As of the 2020 census, the CDP had a total population of 56,415, down from 57,156 at the 2010 census.

On 16 November 2022, a driver veered onto the wrong side of the road in an SUV and hit 25 Los Angeles County sheriff's and police recruits who were jogging near the sheriff's training academy near Mills Avenue and Trumball Street. Five recruits were in critical condition. Injuries included head trauma, broken bones and loss of limbs. The 22-year-old driver was arrested on suspicion of attempted murder of peace officers. Citing the need for further investigation, authorities released a 22-year-old man who was arrested on suspicion of attempted murder.

Geography
South Whittier is located at  (33.934724, -118.030800).

According to the United States Census Bureau, the CDP has a total area of 5.3 square miles (13.8 km), over 99% of it land.

Climate
According to the Köppen Climate Classification system, South Whittier has a warm-summer Mediterranean climate, abbreviated "Csa" on climate maps.

Demographics

2010
At the 2010 census South Whittier had a population of 57,156. The racial makeup of South Whittier was 33,663 (58.9%) White (16.7% Non-Hispanic White), 859 (1.5%) African American, 743 (1.3%) Native American, 2,305 (4.0%) Asian, 147 (0.3%) Pacific Islander, 17,085 (29.9%) from other races, and 2,354 (4.1%) from two or more races. Hispanic or Latino of any race were 44,094 persons (77.1%).

The census reported that 56,859 people (99.5% of the population) lived in households, 282 (0.5%) lived in non-institutionalized group quarters, and 15 (0%) were institutionalized.

There were 15,067 households, 7,647 (50.8%) had children under the age of 18 living in them, 8,500 (56.4%) were opposite-sex married couples living together, 2,678 (17.8%) had a female householder with no husband present, 1,276 (8.5%) had a male householder with no wife present.  There were 979 (6.5%) unmarried opposite-sex partnerships, and 110 (0.7%) same-sex married couples or partnerships. 1,943 households (12.9%) were one person and 810 (5.4%) had someone living alone who was 65 or older. The average household size was 3.77.  There were 12,454 families (82.7% of households); the average family size was 4.05.

The age distribution was 16,274 people (28.5%) under the age of 18, 6,637 people (11.6%) aged 18 to 24, 16,369 people (28.6%) aged 25 to 44, 12,891 people (22.6%) aged 45 to 64, and 4,985 people (8.7%) who were 65 or older.  The median age was 32.0 years. For every 100 females, there were 98.5 males.  For every 100 females age 18 and over, there were 97.0 males.

There were 15,600 housing units at an average density of 2,918.2 per square mile, of the occupied units 9,563 (63.5%) were owner-occupied and 5,504 (36.5%) were rented. The homeowner vacancy rate was 1.1%; the rental vacancy rate was 3.7%.  36,050 people (63.1% of the population) lived in owner-occupied housing units and 20,809 people (36.4%) lived in rental housing units.

According to the 2010 United States Census, South Whittier had a median household income of $65,815, with 11.4% of the population living below the federal poverty line.

2000
At the 2000 census there were 55,193 people, 14,673 households, and 12,266 families in the CDP. The population density was 10,257.7 inhabitants per square mile (3,961.0/km). The racial makeup of the CDP was 52.47% White, 1.47% African American, 1.23% Native American, 3.02% Asian, 0.26% Pacific Islander, 36.37% from other races, and 5.18% from two or more races. Hispanic or Latino of any race were 69.31%.

Of the 14,673 households 48.0% had children under the age of 18 living with them, 60.5% were married couples living together, 15.5% had a female householder with no husband present, and 16.4% were non-families. 12.2% of households were one person and 5.1% were one person aged 65 or older.  The average household size was 3.74 and the average family size was 3.99.

The age distribution was 33.1% under the age of 18, 10.5% from 18 to 24, 31.5% from 25 to 44, 16.7% from 45 to 64, and 8.2% 65 or older.  The median age was 29 years. For every 100 females, there were 100.8 males.  For every 100 females age 18 and over, there were 97.8 males.

The median household income was $47,378 and the median family income  was $49,756. Males had a median income of $32,314 versus $25,605 for females. The per capita income for the CDP was $15,080.  About 9.2% of families and 12.4% of the population were below the poverty line, including 15.0% of those under age 18 and 7.5% of those age 65 or over.

Government

The Los Angeles County Sheriff's Department (LASD) operates the Norwalk Station in Norwalk, serving South Whittier. In addition the department operates the Whittier Substation in South Whittier.

See also

Whittier, California

References

Census-designated places in Los Angeles County, California
Census-designated places in California